Anatoli Ryabov (born 16 July 1994) is a Russian ice hockey player. He is currently playing in the Minor Hockey League (MHL) with the Tyumen Legion. Ryabov was selected in the first round (13th overall) of the 2011 KHL Junior Draft by Torpedo Nizhny Novgorod.

Ryabov competed with Team Russia in the 2011 World Junior A Challenge which was held in Langley, British Columbia, Canada.

References

External links

1994 births
Living people
Russian ice hockey centres
Tyumen Legion players
People from Tyumen
Sportspeople from Tyumen Oblast